William Lee de Havilland (born 8 November 1994) is an English professional footballer who plays for Maidenhead United, as a defender.

De Havilland began his career with Millwall, never making a first-team appearance, and spending loan spells with non-league clubs Cambridge City and Histon. After leaving Millwall in 2014 he had a brief spell, also in non-league, with Bishop's Stortford, before returning to league football with Sheffield Wednesday. He left the club after two years, having not made a first-team appearance, and signed for Wycombe Wanderers where he made his professional debut. He spent loan spells at non-league Aldershot Town and Maidstone United. In June 2018 it was announced that he would sign a permanent contract with Maidstone United in July 2018.

Career
De Havilland began his career with Millwall, spending a loan spell with Cambridge City and two loan spells with Histon. After playing for Bishop's Stortford, he signed for Sheffield Wednesday in August 2014. He moved to Wycombe Wanderers in July 2016. He signed on loan for Aldershot Town in July 2017. He signed on loan for Maidstone United in February 2018.

In May 2018 it was announced that he would not be retained by Wycombe following the end of the 2017–18 season. Later that month Maidstone United announced that De Havilland would re-sign for them. Maidstone United were relegated at the end of the 2018–19 season, and de Havilland had a relegation clause in his contract. He signed for Dover Athletic in June 2019. Following's Dover's decision to not play any more matches in the 2020–21 season, made in late January, and subsequent null and voiding of all results, on 5 May 2021 it was announced that de Havilland was out of contract and had left the club.

On 1 July 2021 it was announced that he had joined Maidenhead United.

Career statistics

Playing style
De Havilland, a defender, bases his playing style on John Terry and Gary Cahill.

References

1994 births
Living people
English footballers
Millwall F.C. players
Cambridge City F.C. players
Histon F.C. players
Bishop's Stortford F.C. players
Sheffield Wednesday F.C. players
Wycombe Wanderers F.C. players
Aldershot Town F.C. players
Maidstone United F.C. players
Dover Athletic F.C. players
Maidenhead United F.C. players
English Football League players
National League (English football) players
Southern Football League players
Association football defenders